Artificial Hallucination is the second album by Japanese band Schwarz Stein, released in 2004.

The first print of the album came with a limited poster and a special "Message CD" with spoken message from the band.

Track listing
"Testament" (music: Hora, lyrics: Kaya) – 2:33
"Addictive Epicurean" (music: Hora, lyrics: Kaya) – 4:31
"Profane gene" (music: Hora, lyrics: Kaya) – 4:05
"Creeper" (music: Hora, lyrics: Kaya) – 4:12
"the alternation of generations -expire-" (music: Hora, lyrics: Kaya) – 4:08
"Emergence of Silence" (music: Hora, lyrics: Kaya) – 5:02
"Perfect Garden SK0520MIX" (music: Hora, lyrics: Kaya) – 3:39
"Corroded Cage" (music: Hora, lyrics: Kaya) – 4:44
"Schism" (music: Hora) – 1:17
"Last Hallucination" (music: Hora, lyrics: Kaya) – 6:11

Personnel
 Kaya - Vocals, lyrics
 Hora - Keyboards, vocals, and programming

2004 albums
Schwarz Stein albums